A bust of Mahatma Gandhi is installed in Salt Lake City, Utah, United States. Donated by the Government of India and the Consul General of India in 1997, the sculpture is displayed in India's section of Jordan Park's International Peace Gardens. The work was dedicated on May 10, 1997.

References

1997 establishments in Utah
Busts in the United States
Cultural depictions of Mahatma Gandhi
Memorials to Mahatma Gandhi
Monuments and memorials in Utah
Outdoor sculptures in Salt Lake City
Sculptures of men in Utah